The Chirinda apalis (Apalis chirindensis) is a species of bird in the family Cisticolidae. It is found in the Eastern Highlands of Zimbabwe and Mozambique. Its natural habitats are subtropical or tropical moist lowland forest and subtropical or tropical moist montane forest.

References

External links
 Chirinda apalis - Species text in The Atlas of Southern African Birds.

Chirinda apalis
Birds of Southern Africa
Vertebrates of Zimbabwe
Vertebrates of Mozambique
Chirinda apalis
Taxonomy articles created by Polbot
Fauna of the Eastern Highlands